Morning Becomes Eclectic (MBE) is a three-hour adult album alternative radio program first aired in 1977 and broadcast live every weekday from KCRW in Santa Monica, California. The show's name is a play on the Eugene O'Neill trilogy of plays, Mourning Becomes Electra.

The program was created by Isabel Holt. MBE was previously hosted by Tom Schnabel (July 1979 - November 1990), Chris Douridas (1990 - 1998), and Nic Harcourt (1998 - November 2008). Jason Bentley followed Harcourt as host in 2008. He announced that he was relinquishing his duties as Music Director and host of Morning Becomes Eclectic after 10 years on August 30, 2019.  Anne Litt, the station's current Program Director of Music, served as host from January of 2020 until February of 2021. In December of 2020, Novena Carmel and Anthony Valadez were named as the new hosts, beginning their tenure on February 2, 2021.

The show is repeated twice on KCRW's music webcast, and live performances are also sometimes available as audio and video podcasts.  Typically, the show features two or three live performances each week during the last hour of the day's broadcast.

KCRW Sounds Eclectico 
KCRW Sounds Eclectico is a compilation album featuring live performances by leading Latin alternative artists on Morning Becomes Eclectic. The album was released by Nacional Records and co-produced by the show's host Nic Harcourt and veteran Latin rock artist manager Tomas Cookman.

The KCRW Sounds Eclectico track listing features acts such as Julieta Venegas, Brazilian Girls, Manu Chao,  Ozomatli, Café Tacvba, Kinky, Thievery Corporation, Aterciopelados, Sidestepper and Plastilina Mosh. Participating artists donated their proceeds from their live performances to KCRW, with the funds directed towards the support of music programming on the station.  Some of the recordings were re-broadcast on the weekly syndicated program "Sounds Eclectic" distributed by Public Radio International. All performances were recorded live to two track digital audio tape and/or Pro Tools sessions and can be found archived in their entirety at KCRW. The album artwork was designed by Beck.

Track listing 
 Café Tacvba – La Muerte Chiquita
 Julieta Venegas – Lo Que Pidas
 Sidestepper – Deja
 Juana Molina – Insensible
 Jorge Drexler – El Pianista del Gueto de Varsovia
 Thievery Corporation – Shadows of Ourselves
 Plastilina Mosh – Baretta 89
 Aterciopelados – Baracunatana
 Los Amigos Invisibles – Gorditas de Mario
 Manu Chao – Clandestino
 Omara Portuondo  - No Me Vayas a Enganar
 Brazilian Girls – Homme
 Los Lobos – Carabina 30-30
 Ozomatli – Saturday Night
 Kinky – Sol (Batucada)
 El Gran Silencio – Sound System Municipal

References

External links 
 
Morning Becomes Eclectic 
"KCRW — A Tradition of Excellence", Santa Monica College, Profiles, 2002
Behind the scenes at KCRW by EPIC FU, weekly web show that covers online pop culture (June 24, 2008)

American music radio programs
Audio podcasts
KCRW
Public Radio International programs
1977 radio programme debuts